Elwi Gazi (April 1929 – 24 June 2012) was an Egyptian equestrian. He competed in two events at the 1960 Summer Olympics.

References

1929 births
2012 deaths
Egyptian male equestrians
Olympic equestrians of Egypt
Equestrians at the 1960 Summer Olympics
People from Monufia Governorate